Interstellaires is the tenth studio album by French singer-songwriter Mylène Farmer. It was released on 6 November 2015 in France by Polydor Records. It is produced by Martin Kierszenbaum and The Avener.

Singles 
On 18 August 2015, a new temporary site was launched, presenting a countdown whose timer was set to end on 28 August 2015, announcing Farmer's return with a brand new record. Its background pictured Farmer and British singer Sting, indicating a collaboration. On 28 August 2015, their single "Stolen Car" was available on iTunes. It is a new version of a song which was originally released on Sting's 2003 Sacred Love album, Farmer's and Sting's duet hit number one on the French chart.

A promo single "Insondables", was released on 28 October 2015.

"City of Love" was released as the second single of the album on 8 January 2016, followed by a remix by Martin Kierszenbaum featuring Shaggy in February 2016, also peaking at number one on the French chart.

Release and promotion 
On 16 September 2015, French magazine Gala announced Farmer's upcoming studio album title. It was then officially confirmed on 16 September 2015 by the singer's recording label, Polydor, through its Facebook page. Another temporaneous site was then launched with a timer set to the album release, as previously done with the "Stolen Car" single. Its layout pictured a nebula with flowing stars in the background and a deep, loud noise added, just like the one that could have already been heard with "Stolen Car"'s site, possibly matching the album core theme.

Commercial reception
On the chart edition of 14 November 2015, Interstellaires debuted at number one on the French Album chart, performing which was then the highest weekly sales of 2015 in France, with 109,971 sales, including 6,153 downloads. The next week, the album dropped to number three with 26,944 sales. At the same date, the album debuted at number one in the francophone part of Belgium (Wallonia), then dropped to number two. In both countries, it was dislodged by Johnny Hallyday's new studio album De l'amour. Interstellaires entered at a peak of number 21 in Flanders, which became the highest position for one of the singer's albums on that chart, and also charted in Germany and the Netherlands, where it peaked at number 79 and in Greece  at number 70. Interstellaires also marked Farmer's debut on a Billboard chart, reaching number 9 on the World Chart.

Track listing

Charts

Weekly charts

Year-end charts

Certifications and sales

Release history

References 

2015 albums
Mylène Farmer albums